Cabaret Mechanical Theatre is an English organisation that mounts exhibitions around the world of contemporary automata by a collective of artists. Founded by Sue Jackson, the group played a central role in the revival of automata from the 1970s onwards, and Jackson championed the idea of automata as a form of contemporary art.

Cabaret Mechanical Theatre was started in 1979 in Falmouth, Cornwall, where Jackson encouraged local artists Peter Markey, Paul Spooner and Ron Fuller to manufacture automata for her craft shop, "Cabaret". The shop became an exhibition space and the collection moved to Covent Garden, central London, in 1984, remaining there until 2000 when rising rates forced it to close.

Part of the Cabaret Mechanical Theatre collection remains on display at the American Visionary Arts Museum in Baltimore, Maryland.

References

External links
 Cabaret Mechanical Theatre website
 Cabaret Mechanical Theatre on YouTube

1979 establishments in England
Arts organizations established in 1979
Arts organisations based in the United Kingdom
Art exhibitions in the United Kingdom
English contemporary art
Traveling exhibits
Automata (mechanical)